Stanisława Celińska (born 29 April 1947 in Warsaw, Poland) is a Polish actress. For her roles she won two Polish Film Awards and was nominated three times.

Career
In 1968, Celińska debuted in the theatre. A year later she graduated from Akademia Teatralna im. Aleksandra Zelwerowicza in Warsaw. Since then, she performed in many Warsaw theatres. Currently, Celińska performs in Nowy Teatr and Teatr Współczesny, both in Warsaw. In 2015, her second album (Atramentowa) as a vocalist ranked high on the Polish charts and became a gold album.

In 1986, she was awarded a Silver Cross of Merit, a Polish civil state award recognizing services to the state.

Filmography

Television

Polish dubbing

References

External links

1947 births
Living people
Polish actresses
Polish voice actresses
Polish film actresses
Polish television actresses
20th-century Polish actresses
Polish stage actresses
Recipients of the Gold Medal for Merit to Culture – Gloria Artis
Recipients of the Gold Cross of Merit (Poland)
Recipients of the Silver Cross of Merit (Poland)
Aleksander Zelwerowicz National Academy of Dramatic Art in Warsaw alumni